is a Japanese footballer currently playing as a forward for Iwate Grulla Morioka.

Career statistics

Club
.

Notes

References

External links

1996 births
Living people
Association football people from Hokkaido
Japanese footballers
Association football forwards
J3 League players
Hokkaido Consadole Sapporo players
Iwate Grulla Morioka players